Cercophana is a genus of moths in the family Saturniidae first described by Cajetan Felder in 1862.

Species
Cercophana frauenfeldi Felder, 1862
Cercophana venusta (Walker, 1856)

References

Cercophaninae